Porphyrochroa aliena is a species of dance flies, in the fly family Empididae.

References

Empididae
Insects described in 2008
Diptera of South America
Insects of Brazil